Mont Brome (aka Bromont, Bromount, Mount Brome) is part of the Monteregian Hills in southern Quebec. It is near the town of Bromont, Quebec. The ski resort Ski Bromont lies on its slopes.

Geology
Mont Brome might be the deep extension of a vastly eroded ancient volcanic complex, which was probably active about 125 million years ago. The mountain was created when the North American Plate moved westward over the New England hotspot, along with other mountains of the Monteregian Hills that form part of the vast Great Meteor hotspot track.

See also
 Volcanism in Canada
 Monteregian Hills

References

Landforms of Montérégie
Brome
Brome
Igneous petrology of Quebec